José Osvaldo de Meira Penna (March 14, 1917 – July 29, 2017) was a Brazilian classical liberal writer and diplomat. He was one of the exponents of Brazilian classical liberalism, Austrian School and conservatism, a member of the Mont Pèlerin Society, and one of the greatest proponents of graduation courses and study centers dedicated to the analysis of International Relations in Brazil.

Works 
 2006: Polemos: uma análise crítica do Darwinismo
 2004: Nietzsche e a Loucura 
 2002: Quando mudam as capitais
 2002: Da moral em economia
 2001: Cândido Pafúncio
 2001: Ai que Dor de Cabeça! ISBN 9788573726220
 2001: Urânia ISBN 8587638645
 1999: Em Berço Esplêndido - Ensaios de psicologia coletiva brasileira.
 1995: Elefantes e Nuvens
 1994: A Ideologia do século XX
 1997: O Espírito das Revoluções
 1992: Decência já!
 1991: Opção Preferencial Pela Riqueza
 1988: Utopia Brasileira. 
 1988: O Dinossauro
 1982: O Evangelho Segundo Marx
 1980: O Brasil na idade da Razão
 1980: Elogio do Burro.
 1974: Em berço esplêndido.
 1972: Psicologia do subdesenvolvimento. 
 1967: Política externa, segurança e desenvolvimento
 1948: O sonho de Sarumoto
 1944: Shanghai - Aspectos Históricos da China Moderna

References 

Ambassadors of Brazil to Israel
Ambassadors of Brazil to Nigeria
Ambassadors of Brazil to Norway
Ambassadors of Brazil to Ecuador
Ambassadors of Brazil to the United States
Ambassadors of Brazil to France
Ambassadors of Brazil to Poland
Austrian School economists
Brazilian centenarians
Brazilian classical liberals
Brazilian diplomats
Brazilian non-fiction writers
Conservatism in Brazil
1917 births
2017 deaths
20th-century Brazilian male writers
21st-century Brazilian male writers
Men centenarians
Male non-fiction writers
Member of the Mont Pelerin Society